Ta Saen is a khum (commune) of Kamrieng District in Battambang Province in north-western Cambodia.

Villages
Source:

 Dei Kraham
 Ou Chamlang
 Ou Anlok
 Ou Toek Thla
 Samaki
 Ou Tracheakchet

References

Communes of Battambang province
Kamrieng District